Alraune, later renamed Unnatural: The Fruit of Evil, is a 1952 black and white West German science fiction film directed by Arthur Maria Rabenalt, based on the 1911 novel Alraune by German novelist Hanns Heinz Ewers, starring Hildegard Knef and Erich von Stroheim. The film involves a scientist (von Stroheim) who creates a woman (Knef) who is beautiful and yet soulless, lacking any sense of morality.

Plot
  
Medical student Frank Braun (Karlheinz Böhm) arrives at his uncle's estate, Professor Jacob ten Brinken (Erich von Stroheim), to ask for a loan in order to continue his studies to become a doctor. Instead he comes across a beautiful woman Alraune (Hildegard Knef) gazing outside on the second story of the house. Upon asking the maid (Gardy Brombacher), she claims to not know of any guests staying at the moment and to return the next day to see his uncle. He meets with his friends Wolf Gontram (Rolf Henniger) and Count "Gerald" Geroldingen (Harry Meyen). Desperately anxious to know the identity of the mysterious woman, they decide return to ten Brinken's home. While Gerald and Wolf don't meet her, Frank manages to strike a conversation with Alraune, and learn's she is Professor Jacob ten Brinken's daughter, who ran away from the university, and asks him to meet her again the next day at the nearby sundial.

Later, Frank meets with his uncle who greatly refuses to loan him the money he needs, so he goes to see an old family friend, Fürstin Wolkonska (Trude Hesterberg). Wolkonska believes Frank to be a good match of a husband for her daughter Olga (Julia Koschka), so she offers to loan the money Frank needs on the condition that he continues his studies at the Sorbonne University in Paris, as a means to keep him away from Alraune. When asked, she explains how his uncle was once a medical doctor who was expelled from the university for constructing bizarre abnormal experiments with artificial insemination. She further elaborates this as reasoning as to why ten Brinken refused to loan him money.

The next day, Frank and Alraune meet as planned, they quickly profess their love and desire to be together. Though Frank informs her that he'll be leaving for Paris the next day, Alraune wishes to accompany him and leave her father. The two come up with a plan to meet the next day again at the sundial. Once ten Brinken learns of their plan, he changes his mind about the loan, as a way to keep Alraune at bay, to which Frank refuses as confesses his love for Alraune. Ten Brinken sees no other option than to tell the truth surrounding his "daughter". He learns, through a medical diary, that with the help of the Fürstin he was able to successfully artificially impregnate a seedy prostate with the sperm of a murderer trialed to be hanged. He goes on to elaborate how the seed of evil and malefic traits from her biological parents have only grown since her "unnatural birth". Ten Brinken details how she has the ability "lures men to their demise", to which Frank is horrified by the true counts of her nature. He leaves for Paris that night without Alraune. Devastated and betrayed, she begins to show more signs of lacking any soul or morality and begins. She suggests to ten Brinken to buy acres of land, but upon arriving they learn that it is covered with sulfur spring. While her mother travels to Paris, Olga stays with ten Brinken in his home. She receives a later from her mother in regards to her pre-arranged engagement to Frank, which doesn't sit well with Alraune. Alraune manages to convince Olga that no man who truly loves a woman would pronounce a proposal through a letter. Devastated though influenced by Alraune, Olga attempts suicide by poisoning herself.

Alraune then begins using her sexual appeal to flirt with men that have fallen for her. She goes horseback riding with Gerald during a rainstorm, carriage riding with Mathieu, ten Brinken's coachman, and poses herself for Ralph to paint her. When one of Alraune's necklace winds up missing, she accuses her teacher, Mademoiselle Duvaliere (Denise Vernac), which in fact was found inside her luggage, who is then fired for theft. She later discovers that in fact it was Doctor Mohn (Harry Halm) who stole the necklace from Alraune's jewelry box and framed Duvaliere, all to gain attention from Alraune.

Months later, Frank returns from Paris having completed his studies. Upon returning, Alraune still proclaims her love towards him, though Frank resent's her. Alraune, now distraught by this begins unleashing her "true nature of evil". Mathieu's carriage falls over a cliff, Ralph gets sick and dies from pneumonia while Gerald is killed by Dr.Mohn. With no man seemingly able to make her happy, Alraune questions her own morality and emotions for Frank. She pleads Frank for his help, even going as far to cry real tears. Frank, taken back by this, realizes that everything he was told about this "unnatural being" is false, she can evoke emotions and not as "soulless" as originally described, he takes her back and they plan to go run away together. Alraune tells ten Brinken about their plans, but he refuses to let her go, his reasoning in that she will destroy him and herself, just as she did with the other men. He gives her the diary detailing who she is and her parent's and upon reading it, decides not to go away with Frank.

Days later, the sulfur spring has died out and Dr.Mohn is threatening to expose ten Brinken for his illegal experiments. He plans to run away to Germany with the left over money from the land with Alraune. Duvaliere worries that she will be too be exposed for her involvement with the experiments. She talks with Frank about the ordeal and is surprised to learn of his true feelings for Alraune. They both travel to ten Brinken's estate. Upon arriving, Duvaliere accuses ten Brinken of being "mad" and is incredibly jealous of Alraune's affection for Frank. Frank pursues Alraune through the forest where she hallucinates in seeing her dead "lovers" and overwhelmed by this, she faints. Upon awakening, Frank confesses his love once more for Alraune and reasons with her as not being the factor in his friends deaths. She disagrees, convinced that she is nothing but "the bringer of destruction" as she is the direct result of a cruel trial of her ungodly father, heightened by the evil thoughts of her parents. He convinces her that both good and evil are always present in each individual, regardless of circumstances, and that the good can in her can win over the evil.

Frank carries Alraune back to the estate, where as they arrive, ten Brinken is convinced that she will leave him for Frank. He then pulls out his gun and shoots her -"Now the toy is broken-the crime against nature that God didn’t want.” Alraune dies, dissolving into a mandrake root body with the seed of her true nature finally destroyed. Ten Brinken is arrested and then hanged for the murder of "his child".

Cast

Production

Development 
In an Interview given back in February 1989 he stated how his involvement begin with "Carlton was Stapenhorst, and then there was an Austrian producer who made his money primarily from petrol stations and was a very stubborn, mindless, peasant person. He had a contract with the Knef and, according to his idea, the Knef should be the Mandrake after the sinner (1951) and Erich von Stroheim the genius-crazy scientist."

Even from its earliest stage, Alraune was stirring controversy Just the announcement "Erich von Stroheim and Hildegard Knef in Alraune" led to a scandal. The church pulpits were spoken against the film, against the topic of artificial insemination; at that time the church had a great influence on cultural politics. Stapenhorst was happy about the advertisement, but he also feared the power of the church. Our task now was to dramatize the magically demonic element in the sex and horror material in a Catholic affirmative....It was really an ordeal, I think we wrote 16 versions of the script and changed it until the shoot. Now Stapenhorst, who was an old professional, had once had a blackout and Stroheim had the right to write his own dialogues. And Stroheim, who used to be a great director, now saw himself as a writer and came every morning with four pages of new text and from the well-behaved version that we had struggled to find, again and again made Stroheim a sharp horror film. But the audience didn't want horror, the war was still deep in everyone's bones. And the church didn't want sex..."

Casting 
At the time the cast was considered to be 'All-star", even more so as Eric von Strohiem was respectfully known as "one of the great silent film director", who had all but retired from acting by the time Alraune was to begin filming. Hildegard Knef had also achieved fame in both her native country Germany and international fame. Robert Craig would later write in his book, It Came from 1957: A Critical Guide to the Year's Science Fiction, Fantasy and Horror Films, that "Knef's sultry, smoking sexuality was perfect for her role...it gives the film much of its palpable tension".

Mis-en-scene 
Alraune is rooted from an actual plant Mandrake, which is German for mandragora. While the book stays relatively faithful to the book, unlike the 1928 film, there is a shot in the film which depicts Alraune's wide eyed face fades out of focus into the grotesque version of a mandrake. The pant is deeply rooted in German literature and folklore. The plant is believed to bring good fortune and solidarity while also bring death and destroying all who curate it. The film seems to suggest that when humanity forgets its place in the natural order, it is destined to be eradicated. Set Decoration was done by Robert Health with the costume design by Herbrert Ploberger.

Music 
The film's soundtrack and music was composed by Werner Richard Heymann, who had a well known career in the German industry and Hollywood. The only two songs on the soundtrack were sung by Hildegard Knef, with the songs "Huet' befall' ice mir" and "Das lied von kinsmen mächden" written by lyricist Robert Gilbert. The sound team consisted of Heinz Terworth and Klang-Film Eurocord.

Release
Alraune was released in Germany on 23 October 1952 where it was distributed by Gloria-Filmverleih.  In 1957 Hal Roach Junior's, Distributors Corporation of America released Alraune, now renamed Unnatural: The Fruit of Evil, in an English dubbed version to arthouse and grindhouse theaters. The English Language Version was recorded by the American Dubbing Company. It is also available for streaming service on Amazon Prime Video. and YouTube.

Adaptations 
A number of films and other works are based on or inspired by the novel Alraune.

Alraune (1952) is the fifth adaptation of Ewers' book, the first being the 1918 silent version directed by Michael Curtiz which has long been believed to no longer exist in studio archives. The second adaptation came shortly after which, despite the title, has very little to no connection to the novel other than the Mandrake root.  A third adaptation was then released a decade later with Alraune (1928 film), a black and white version though silent, with it being widely considered the best adaptation which was directed by Henrik Galeen. In comparison to the film in 1928, C. Hooper Trask of The New York Times wrote, "if you like this sort of thing you'll find it a superior product. Heinrich Galeen has directed with photographic imagination—no question that the picture has atmosphere". In 1995 a character named "Professor Ten Brincken",  in Kim Newman's vampire novel The Bloody Red Baron, is the 'mad scientist' who creates Alraune.  A black and white miniseries of comics books was released between 1998 and 2004: Alraune, was illustrated by Tony Greis. The comic books deviate significantly from the novel as the main character is cursed and must live as if she is Alraune until she can find a way out from under the curse.

Reception
The film has received collaborative reviews over the years though many have seemed negative.

In a contemporary review, Variety noted that "in the early 1900s, when the H. H. Ewers novel Alraune cut a swatch in the German-language world [...] the very thought of artificial insemination of humans was mentionable only in whispers." and that "times and sensations change." The review opined that Knef's acting had "limited range" and that von Stroheim produces "only a laboured setting for a range of costumes changes and phony thunderstorms for the lethal Alraune".

In regards to von Stroheim's performance, Kirkus Reviews wrote, "A magisterial, crazily comprehensive biographical study of the original renegade director" while Times Literary Supplement wrote " A monument to the awful Good Old Days of an infant Hollywood"

Michael Den Boer writes that "Though this film has a Gothic Horror vibe, it’s far-fetched premise ventures into the realm of science fiction. With that being said, there is one area where this film does not fully deliver in regards to its most unusual premise. And that is how the film does not exploit the more salacious aspects of its premise and how the narrative resembles something more akin to what one would expect from a melodrama". 

Dennis Schwartz "It’s a hokum sci-fi film that only resonates because Von Stroheim is at his Prussian best as a man possessed by his incestuous love for his foster daughter and arrogant about his superior intellect. Von Stroheim’s a treat to watch, but it’s still a dull visual film that never made good use of its unusual premise and was never emotionally satisfying as a drama."

See also 

 Alraune (1918 film)
 Alraune (1928 film)
 Alraune (1930 film)
 Artificial insemination
 Science fiction
 West Germany
 Mandragora officinarum
German folklore
Cinema of Germany
Black and white

References

Footnotes

Sources

Further reading

External links 
 
 Alraune at filmportal.de/en
Alraune on Amazon Prime
Alraune on YouTube

1952 films
1952 horror films
1950s science fiction horror films
German fantasy films
West German films
1950s German-language films
German black-and-white films
Films based on German novels
Films based on works by Hanns Heinz Ewers
Films directed by Arthur Maria Rabenalt
Remakes of German films
Erotic fantasy films
Films set in the 1900s
German science fiction horror films
1950s German films